Wellington Land District may refer to:
 Wellington Land District, Western Australia
 Wellington Land District, Tasmania 
 Wellington Land District, New Zealand, for the Wellington and Manawatū-Whanganui regions; see Land Districts of New Zealand.

District name disambiguation pages